Patrick Charles Behrns (born May 16, 1950) is a former American college football coach. He served as the head coach at the University of Nebraska at Omaha from 1994 through the program being discontinued in March 2011, and was also the head coach of the University of North Dakota Fighting Sioux football team from 1980 to 1985. He is a 1972 graduate of Dakota State University.

Head coaching record

References

1950 births
Living people
Dakota State Trojans football coaches
Dakota State Trojans football players
Nebraska–Omaha Mavericks football coaches
New Mexico State Aggies football coaches
North Dakota Fighting Hawks football coaches
UNLV Rebels football coaches
Utah State Aggies football coaches
New Mexico State University alumni
People from Butler County, Nebraska
Players of American football from Nebraska